Barkers Green is a hamlet near Wem in Shropshire, England.

External links

Hamlets in Shropshire